Miss World Malaysia 2019, the 52nd edition of the Miss World Malaysia pageant. The coronation night was held on October 6, 2019 at Mega Star Arena in Kuala Lumpur.

Special guests include renowned Malaysian model, actress, TV host Amber Chia, Dewi Liana Seriestha (Miss World Malaysia 2014) and Larissa Ping (Miss World Malaysia 2018). The winner received over RM30,000 in cash and a RM25,000 diamond ring from CERES, plus a free 1-month trip to London, United Kingdom.

20 contestants competed in the grand finale. Miss World Malaysia 2018, Larissa Ping crowned her successor, Alexis SueAnn Seow at the end of the event. She represented Malaysia at Miss World 2019 in London, United Kingdom.

Results 
Color keys

Special awards

Contestants 
20 contestants competed for the crown and title.

Judges 
The following served as judges on the coronation night of Miss World Malaysia 2019:

 Amber Chia – Actress, Model, TV Host
 Datuk Sri Navneet Goenka – CEO of Ceres Jewels
 Dewi Liana Seriestha – Miss World Malaysia 2014
 Larissa Ping – Miss World Malaysia 2018

Crossovers 
Contestants who previously competed/appeared at other international/national beauty pageants:

National Pageants 

Miss Universe Malaysia

2018 – Alexis Sue-Ann Seow (1st Runner-up)
2019 – Jean Kueh Yong Jun (Miss Congeniality and Miss Babel Body Beautiful)

Miss Borneo Hornbill Festival

 2018 – Juliana Sambai anak Sibat (Winner)

Miss Grand Malaysia

 2019 – Chermaine Kang Yi Ting

References

External links
 Official Miss World Malaysia Website
 

2019 in Malaysia
2019 beauty pageants
2019